Chinna is one of the leading art director in Indian cinema. His debut venture was ‘'Kalisi Nadudham'’ (Telugu). He started Art direction together with his guru B Anand Sai (son of senior art director B.Chellam). His first movie was as Assistant Art Director for the Tamil movie ‘'Roja Malare'’ starring Murali. Next was '‘Santosham'’ followed by ‘'Enasare Asave'’ and so on.

Then shifted to Hyderabad for ‘'Tholiprema'’. Again together with his guru Anand Sai, he did Telugu movies like '‘Tholiprema'’, ‘'Thamudu'’, '‘Badri'’, ‘'Kushi'’ and ‘'Prematho ra'’. While this was happening he met great producers like Burugupalli Sivarama Krishna, T. Trivikrama Rao and with their encouragement he became Art director in their movies. ‘'Kalisi Nadudham'’ (Telugu) was my first movie as Art director. He also worked with his senior classmate Murthy Sreeram's movie Vechi Vunta. Chinna in an interview said "This was actually my first movie but it got released as my second movie."

He started working on the film KHADGAM starring srikanth and sonali bindre but stopped working for the film due to unknown reasons.

He worked for almost 22 films with the tollywood Director puri jagannath ...

He also started wedding designs ...

In 2015 he designed the wedding MANDAP of PULLA RAO's Daughter marriage for which he got much appreciation and the whole Andhra Pradesh and Telangana recognition..

Filmography 
This list is not a completed one.. Partial filmography is selected.
 Anamika (2013)
 Traffic (2013)
 Manushulatho Jagratha (2013)
 Devudu Chesina Manushulu (2012)
 Cameraman Gangatho Rambabu (2012)
 Businessman (2012)
 Kandireega (2011)
 Adhinayakudu (2012)
 Nenu Naa Rakshasi (2011)
 Nagavalli (2010)
 Golimar (2010)
 Arya 2 (2009)
 Ek Niranjan (2009)
 Bumper Offer (2009)
 Anjaneyulu (2009)
 Ride (2009)
 Wanted Hindi (2009)
 Konchem Ishtam Konchem Kashtam (2009)
 Neninthe (2008)
 Chintakayala Ravi (2008)
 Bujjigaadu: Made in Chennai (2008)
 Desamuduru (2007)
 Chirutha (2007)
 Yogi (2007)
 Hello premistara (2007)
 Pokiri (2006)
 Happy (2006)
 Lakshmi Songs (2006)
 Super (2005)
 Intlo Srimathi Veedhilo Kumari (2004)
 143 (2004)
 Shart: The Challenge (2004)
 Andhrawala (2004)
 Thoda Tum Badlo Thoda Hum (2004)
 Shivamani (2003)
 Tarak (2003)
 Amma Nanna O Tamila Ammayi (2003)
 Pellam Oorelithe (2003)
 Aaduthu paaduthu (2002)
 Anandam (2001)
 Vechivunta (2001)
 Kalisi Naduddam
Controversy

Art director chinna's best industry friend and tollywood director Puri Jagannath were split during the allu arjun starrer IDDARAMMAYILATHO. The reasons were given  why they both split up in spite of their best friendship but the industry people are saying they were not true and the reason is unknown.

Awards

Only few awards are considered ...

Chinna won 10-15 other awards ...

Best art Director for the movie NAGAVALLI in 2010

Best art director for the movie Pokiri

External links 

http://www.Artchinna.com

Indian art directors
Living people
Year of birth missing (living people)